John O'Donovan  (22 May 1858 – 8 April 1927) was a New Zealand police commissioner. He was born in Ross Carbery, County Cork, Ireland, in 1858. He came to New Zealand in 1878 to join his brother Richard, who had represented Okarito on the Westland County Council (1872–1873) and on the Westland Provincial Council (1874–1876).

In the 1920 New Zealand Royal Visit Honours, O'Donovan was appointed a Member (fourth class) of the Royal Victorian Order, and in the 1922 King's Birthday Honours, he was made a Companion of the Imperial Service Order.

References

1858 births
1927 deaths
New Zealand Commissioners of Police
People from County Cork
Irish emigrants to New Zealand (before 1923)
New Zealand Lieutenants of the Royal Victorian Order
New Zealand Companions of the Imperial Service Order